The Williams FW28 was the car with which the Williams team competed in the  Formula One season.  The drivers were Mark Webber and rookie Nico Rosberg, the reigning GP2 Series champion. Webber was in his second year with the team, and teammate Nico Rosberg carried a hint of nostalgia, as Nico's father Keke had won the  F1 championship in a Cosworth-engined Williams.

However, 2006 was very disappointing for the team.  The car was dogged by a handling problem which affected the cars on the entry to corners.  Despite the effectiveness of the Cosworth engine, the Bridgestone tyres and the two drivers, the FW28 could only display brief flashes of promise. Too often this promise was compromised by poor reliability - an embarrassment for a team that prided itself on engineering excellence.

The car seemed competitive at the beginning of the year when the cars scored a double points finish with Rosberg setting the fastest lap of the race on his F1 début at the Bahrain Grand Prix. An excellent second-row qualifying performance at Sepang was wasted when both cars suffered engine failures, and the season went downhill from there. Exceptions were Australia and Monaco, both races where Webber looked a contender for at least a podium finish until retiring on both occasions with hydraulics failure and an exhaust fire respectively.

A note of significance for Webber and Williams came on lap 21 of the 2006 Australian Grand Prix. By leading the lap Webber became the first Australian to have led his home grand prix since the last non-championship AGP was held in 1984.

Livery
Williams went into the 2006 season with renewed major sponsorships such as Allianz, RBS, FedEx, Reuters, ORIS, Hamleys, Budweiser, Petrobras and Castrol. Williams received new sponsorship such as Mobilecast, Tata Group and discontinued sponsorships are Hewlett & Packard.

FW28B 
The Williams FW28B is an interim version of the FW28 the team used to prepare for the 2007 season. After an obviously disappointing 2006, Williams decided to opt for Toyota engines for 2007 and therefore built the FW28B. The car is similar to the FW28 in all aspects except for being powered by Toyota's 2006 engine, the RVX-06.

During winter practice, the team also experimented with new front wings and other aerodynamic parts which helped the development of their new car FW29 car.

Gallery

Complete Formula One results
(key) (results in italics indicate fastest lap)

References

External links

Williams Formula One cars
2006 Formula One season cars